Howard George Willis Ware (August 31, 1920 – November 22, 2013), popularly known as Willis Howard Ware was an American computer pioneer who co-developed the IAS machine that laid down the blueprint of the modern day computer in the late 20th century. He was also a  pioneer of privacy rights, social critic of technology policy, and a founder in the field of computer security.

Biography
As an undergraduate, Ware read electrical engineering at the Moore School of the University of Pennsylvania. He completed his master's degree in the same subject at MIT, in 1942.

During World War II, Ware worked for the Hazeltine Corporation (1942–1946) on classified military projects. After the war (1946–1951), he joined the Institute for Advanced Study at Princeton to work with John von Neumann on building an early computer.  After completing his PhD there, he moved to North American Aviation (1951–1952), helped to move the aviation industry from punch-card machines to early computers, and in 1952 began teaching a class in computing at the UCLA Extension Division; it continued for 12 years. In 1952 he joined the RAND Corporation, where he stayed until 1992. He was an early design engineer on the RAND JOHNNIAC computer.

In 1961, he was the founding president of the American Federation of Information Processing Societies, an early technical computing society. Ware predicted that increased reliance on computers would create new privacy issues, and in 1972 he chaired the Department of Health, Education and Welfare's Special Advisory Committee on Automated Personal Data Systems, which developed policy recommendations including the Code of Fair Information Practice that significantly influenced the Privacy Act of 1974.  He continued to study and write about privacy for many years.

Ware influenced many aspects of computing including the initiation and direction of one of the first computing courses, at UCLA and authored some of the first textbooks in the field of computer security. In addition, he chaired several influential studies, including one in 1967 that produced a groundbreaking and transformational report to the Defense Science Board for ARPA (now DARPA) that was known thereafter as "the Ware report". The European Union's Data Protection Directive was strongly influenced by his research.

Ware died at his home in Santa Monica, California in 2013.

Professional activities
Ware was an active and influential member of many industry organizations including:
Chair of the Institute of Radio Engineers (IRE) Group on Computers (1958 - 1959)
Founding President of the American Federation of Information Processing Societies (1961)
Chair of the Advisory Committee on Automated Personal Data Systems for the Department of Health, Education and Welfare (now HHS) (1972)
Vice Chair of the IFIP TC 11 (1985-1994)
Founding Chair of the Information System and Privacy Advisory Board (1987 - 1998)
US Air Force Scientific Advisory Board
NSA Scientific Advisory Board
Member of the Electronic Privacy Information Center(EPIC) Advisory Board
Member of the National Academy of Engineering

Awards and honors
Fellowships
National Fellow of Tau Beta Pi (1941-1942)
Fellow of the AAAS
Fellow of the IEEE
Fellow of the IRE (1962)
Fellow of the ACM (1994)

Awards
Achievement Award, Los Angeles Chapter, IRE (1957)
Distinguished Service Award, AMPS (1963)
Computer Sciences Man of the Year, Data Processing Management Association (1975)
USAF Exceptional Civilian Service Medal (1979)
IEEE Centennial Medal (1984)
Distinguished Service Award, AMPS (1986)
National Computer System Security Award (1989)
IEEE Computer Pioneer Award (1993)
NIST/NSA National Computer System Security Award (1989)
IFIP Kristian Beckman Award (1999)
Lifetime Achievement Award from the Electronic Privacy Information Center (2012)
Inductee into the Cyber Security Hall of Fame (2013)

Publications
Ware authored over 70 publications over the course of his professional career.

 RAND and the Information Evolution: A History in Essays and Vignettes - 2008
 Security in Computing - 2002 (foreword).
 The Cyber-Posture of the National Information Infrastructure - 1998
 New Vistas on Info-Systems Security - 1997
 Privacy and Security Policy Choices in a National Information Infrastructure Environment - 1996
 A Retrospective on the Criteria Movement - 1995
 Policy Considerations for Data Networks - 1994
 Privacy Dimensions of Medical Record Keeping - 1994
 Statement on Escrowed Key Proposals Presented to the Subcommittee on Technology, Environment, and Aviation, U.S. House of Representatives - 1994
 Cyberspace security and safety - 1993
 The new faces of privacy - 1993
 Perspectives on trusted computer systems - 1988
 Survivability Issues and USAFE Policy - 1988
 Computer security policy issues: from past toward the future - 1987
 A Perspective on the USAFE Collocated Operating Base System - 1986
 Emerging privacy issues - 1985
 Technological perspectives for air base communications - 1985
 Base communications issues for the 1980s - 1984
 Information and communications protection - 1984
 Information systems : the challenge of the future for the Air Force Communications Command - 1984
 Information Systems, Security, and Privacy - 1983
 Perspectives on Oversight Management of Software Development Projects - 1983
 Avionics software: where are we? - 1982
 Information Policy: Thoughts for the 80's - 1982
 Information technology, crime and the law - 1982
 Security, privacy, and national vulnerability - 1981
 A taxonomy for privacy - 1981
 Security and privacy in the 80s - 1980
 Computer security in civil government and industry - 1979
 Security Controls for Computer Systems: Report of Defense Science Board Task Force on Computer Security - 1979
 Computers and personal privacy - 1977
 Computer technology: for beffter or worse? - 1977
 Federal and state regulations concerning the privacy of health care data - 1977
 Privacy and patient rights - 1977
 Privacy—handling personal data - 1977
 Privacy Issues in the Private Sector - 1977
 Public policy aspects for an information age - 1977
 Testimony before the House Subcommittee on Communications hearings: impact of telecommunications technology on the right to privacy - 1977
 The Computer Resources Management Study - 1976
 Privacy and Security Issues in Information Systems - 1976
 Privacy aspects of health statistics - 1976
 Privacy Issues and the Private Sector. - 1976
 Project RAND and Air Force Decisionmaking - 1976
 State of the Privacy Act: An Overview of Technological and Social Science Developments. - 1976
 Testimony before the National Commission of Electronic Fund Transfers. - 1976
 The Computer Resource Management Study: Executive Summary - 1975
 Legislative Issues Surrounding the Confidentiality of Health Records. - 1975
 Privacy and Security in Computer Systems - 1975
 Privacy: The Private Sector and Society's Needs. - 1975
 Computer Privacy and Computer Security. - 1974
 A Proposed Strategy for the Acquisition of Avionics Equipment - 1974
 Remarks—Seminar for Directors of Academic Computing Services. - 1974
 Computers and Society: The Technological Setting. - 1973
 Computers, Personal Privacy and Human Choice. - 1973
 Data Banks, Privacy, and Society - 1973
 Records, Computers and the Rights of Citizens - 1973
 Testimony to the Assembly Committee on Efficiency and Cost Control. - 1973
 The Ultimate Computer. - 1972
 Computers in Society's Future. - 1971
 Limits in Computing Power. - 1971
 Computer Data Banks and Security Controls. - 1970
 On Limits in Computing Power. - 1969
 Testimony Before the Assembly Statewide Information Policy Committee. - 1969
 The Computer in Your Future - 1967
 Security and Privacy in Computer Systems. - 1967
 Future Computer Technology and Its Impact - 1966
 Johnniac Eulogy - 1966
 Soviet Cybernetics Technology: V. Soviet Process Control Computers. - 1965
 The Programmer in a Changing World. - 1963
 Soviet Cybernetics Technology: II. General Characteristics of Several Soviet Computers - 1963
 Soviet Cybernetics Technology: III, Programming Elements of the BESM, STRELA, Ural, M-3, and Kiev Computers. - 1963
 Soviet Cybernetics Technology: I. Soviet Cybernetics, 1959-1962. - 1963
 The Evolution of Concepts and Languages of Computing. - 1962
 Soviet Computer Technology - 1959 - 1960
 The History and Development of the Electronic Computer Project at the Institute for Advanced Study - 1953
 The Logical Principles of a New Kind of Binary Counter - 1953

See also
Data Protection Directive – European law inspired by Ware's research
Information privacy law
List of pioneers in computer science

External links
Oral history interview with Willis H. Ware (1981). Charles Babbage Institute, University of Minnesota.  Primarily devoted to Ware's work on the Institute for Advanced Study computer project in the late 1940s. Ware details the contributions of Jule Gregory Charney, John von Neumann, Herman Goldstine, and others. Ware also relates his move to the RAND Corporation.
Oral history interview with Willis H. Ware (2003). Charles Babbage Institute, University of Minnesota.  Discusses the history of computer science at RAND Corporation and other topics. This includes the transition of RAND to digital computing with the [Johnniac] project.  Ware also talks about his work and leadership in organizations such as Association for Computing Machinery and AFIPS, as well as on the issues of computer security and privacy with the Ware Report of the Defense Science Board Task Force on Computer Security, HEW's Advisory Committee on Automated Personal Data, and the Privacy Protection Study Commission.

References

1920 births
2013 deaths
American computer scientists
Privacy activists
RAND Corporation people
Fellow Members of the IEEE
Members of the United States National Academy of Engineering
Fellows of the American Association for the Advancement of Science
Fellows of the Association for Computing Machinery
IEEE Centennial Medal laureates
Computer security academics